The Jackson Group is a geologic group in Arkansas and North Carolina. It preserves fossils dating back to the Paleogene to Neogene period. The area is where the type specimen of Basilosaurus and ancient whale confused to be a reptile was found.

See also

 List of fossiliferous stratigraphic units in North Carolina

References

 

Geologic groups of Arkansas
Paleogene Arkansas
Paleogene geology of North Carolina